Federico da Montefeltro, also known as Federico III da Montefeltro  KG (7 June 1422 – 10 September 1482), was one of the most successful mercenary captains (condottieri) of the Italian Renaissance, and lord of Urbino from 1444 (as Duke from 1474) until his death. A renowned intellectual humanist and civil leader in Urbino on top of his impeccable reputation for martial skill and honor, he commissioned the construction of a great library, perhaps the largest of Italy after the Vatican, with his own team of scribes in his scriptorium, and assembled around him a  large humanistic court in  the Ducal Palace, Urbino, designed by Luciano Laurana and Francesco di Giorgio Martini.

Biography

Federico was born in Castello di Petroia in Gubbio, the illegitimate son of Guidantonio da Montefeltro, lord of Urbino, Gubbio and Casteldurante, and Duke of Spoleto. Two years later he was legitimized by Pope Martin V, with the consent of Guidantonio's wife, Caterina Colonna, who was Martin's niece.

In the aftermath of the Peace of Ferrara (see Wars in Lombardy) in 1433, he lived in Venice and Mantua as a hostage. In 1437 he was knighted by Emperor Sigismund, and in the same year he married Gentile Brancaleoni in Gubbio.

At sixteen he began a career as condottiero under Niccolò Piccinino. In 1441 he distinguished himself in the conquest of the castle of St. Leo, which Federico was to hold for the rest of his life. After Piccinino's resignation, he went to Pesaro to defend it against his great enemy in the Marche, Sigismondo Pandolfo Malatesta, lord of Rimini.

On 22 July 1444, his half-brother Oddantonio da Montefeltro, recently created Duke of Urbino by Pope Eugene IV, was assassinated in a conspiracy: Federico, whose probable participation in the plot has never been established, subsequently seized the city of Urbino. However, the financial situation of the small dukedom being in disarray, he continued to wage war as a condottiero. His first condotta was for Francesco I Sforza, with 300 knights: Federico was also one of the few condottieri of the time to have a reputation for inspiring loyalty among his followers. In the pay of the Sforza—for Federico never fought for free—he transferred Pesaro to their control, and, for 13,000 florins, received Fossombrone as his share, infuriating Sigismondo Pandolfo Malatesta. Despite Federico's efforts, the Sforza sovereignty in the Marche was dismantled in the following years. When Sforza left for Lombardy, Sigismondo instigated a riot in Fossombrone, but Federico reconquered it three days later.

After six years in the service of Florence, Federico was hired in 1450 by Sforza, now Duke of Milan. However, he could not perform his duties as he lost his right eye during a tournament. Malatesta profited from his injury to obtain the position under Sforza, whereupon Federico in October 1451 accepted instead a proposal by Alfonso V of Aragon, King of Naples, to fight for him against Florence. After the loss of the eye, Federico – no stranger to conspiracies and one of the leaders that inspired Niccolò Machiavelli to write Il Principe – had surgeons remove the bridge of his nose (which had been injured in the incident) and eyelid. This improved his field of vision to a considerable extent, rendered him less vulnerable to assassination attempts – and, as can be seen by his successful career thereafter, restored his merits as a field commander.

In 1453 the Neapolitan army was struck by malaria, and Federico himself risked losing his healthy eye. The Peace of Lodi of the following year seemed to deprive him of occasions to exhibit his ability as a military commander. In 1458 the death of both Alfonso and of his beloved illegitimate son, Buonconte, did not help to raise Federico's mood. His fortunes recovered when Pius II, a man of culture like him, became Pope and made him Gonfaloniere of the Holy Roman Church. After some notable exploits in the Kingdom of Naples, he fought in the Marche against Malatesta, soundly defeating him at the Cesano river near Senigallia (1462). The following year he captured Fano and Senigallia, taking Sigismondo Pandolfo prisoner. The Pope made him vicar of the conquered territories.

In 1464 the new Pope Paul II called him to push back the Anguillara, from whom he regained much of the northern Lazio for Papal control. The following year he captured Cesena and Bertinoro in Romagna. In 1466 Francesco Sforza died, and Federico assisted his young son Galeazzo Sforza in the government of Milan, and also commanded the campaign against Bartolomeo Colleoni. In 1467 he took part in the Battle of Molinella. In 1469, on the death of Sigismondo Pandolfo, Paul sent him to occupy Rimini: however, fearing that an excessive Papal power in the area could also menace his home base of Urbino, once having entered Rimini Federico kept it for himself. After defeating the Papal forces in a great battle on 30 August 1469, he ceded it to Sigismondo's son, Roberto Malatesta.

The matter was solved by the election of Pope Sixtus IV, who married his favorite nephew Giovanni Della Rovere to Federico's daughter Giovanna, and gave him the title of Duke of Urbino in 1474; Malatesta married his other daughter Elisabetta. Now Federico fought against his former patrons the Florentines, caught in the Pope's attempt to carve out a state for his nephew Girolamo Riario. In 1478 Federico was involved in the Pazzi conspiracy.

However, after the death of his beloved second wife Battista Sforza (daughter of Elisabetta Malatesta and Alessandro Sforza), who died from pneumonia after giving birth to their seventh child at 25 years old, he spent much of his time in the magnificent palace in Urbino. The Duke had lost the mate he described as "the delight of my public and private hours"; a contemporary, speaking of their relationship, had called them two souls in one body. In 1482 he was called to command the army of Ercole I of Ferrara in his war against Venice, but was struck by fever and died in Ferrara in September.

Federico's son, Guidobaldo, was married to Elisabetta Gonzaga, the brilliant and educated daughter of Federico I Gonzaga, lord of Mantua. With Guidobaldo's death in 1508, the duchy of Urbino passed through Giovanna to the papal family of Della Rovere—nephews of Guidobaldo.

Achievements

Arts patronage 
Federico, nicknamed "the Light of Italy", is a landmark figure in the history of the Italian Renaissance for his contributions to enlightened culture. He imposed justice and stability on his tiny state through the principles of his humanist education; he engaged the best copyists and editors in his private scriptorium to produce the most comprehensive library outside of the Vatican; he supported the development of fine artists, including the early training of the young painter Raphael. He was a patron of the writer Cristoforo Landino.

Federico commissioned for himself a studiolo (a small study or cabinet for contemplation) in both his palace at Urbino and that at Gubbio; both are celebrated for their trompe-l'œil decoration executed in marquetry.  The former is still in situ, the latter was eventually purchased by and brought in its entirety to The Metropolitan Museum of Art.

Role in society
Federico took care of soldiers who might be killed or wounded, providing, for example, dowries for their daughters. He often strolled the streets of Urbino unarmed and unattended, inquiring in shops and businesses as to the well-being of the residents of Urbino.  All "citizens", defined exclusively — as in ancient Greece — as the male residents of Urbino, were equal under the law regardless of rank. 

His academic interests were the classics, particularly history and philosophy.

All his personal and professional achievements were financed through mercenary warfare. Commentators insist on his dedication to the well-being of his soldiers explaining why his men proved loyal to him and why Federico technically never lost a war.  He was decorated with almost every military honor.
Edward IV of England made him a Knight of the Most Noble Order of the Garter; he wears the Garter bound round his left knee in the portrait by Pedro Berruguete.

See also 

Wars in Lombardy
Dukes of Urbino
Condottieri
Antonio da Montefeltro
Sigismondo Pandolfo Malatesta
Holy Conversation (Piero della Francesca)
Diptych of Federico da Montefeltro and Battista Sforza

Footnotes

References

External links

Capsule biography
The Gubbio Studiolo and its conservation, volumes 1 & 2, from The Metropolitan Museum of Art Libraries (fully available online as PDF), which contains material on Federico da Montefeltro (see index)

1422 births
1482 deaths
People from Gubbio
Book and manuscript collectors
Federico 3
Dukes of Urbino
Montefeltro, Federico 3
Knights of the Garter